Northgate School District is a diminutive, suburban, public school district located in Allegheny County, Pennsylvania. It serves the boroughs of Bellevue and Avalon, Pennsylvania. According to 2000 federal census data, it serves a resident population of 13,113. In 2009, the district residents' per capita income was $19,001, while the median family income was $41,896.

Northgate School District operates three schools: Bellevue Elementary, Avalon Elementary, and Northgate Junior - Senior High School. Bellevue Elementary and Avalon Elementary are K-6 while the Jr./Sr. High is 7-12.

Extracurriculars
The district offers a variety of clubs, activities and sports.

Sports
The District funds:

Boys:
Baseball - Varsity and Junior Varsity
Basketball - Varsity,  Junior Varsity, Middle School
Cross Country	
Football - Varsity and Junior Varsity
Golf	
Soccer	
Swimming and Diving
Track and Field
Wrestling - Varsity and MS

Girls:
Cheerleading
Basketball - Varsity and Junior Varsity
Cross Country
Softball - Varsity and Middle School
Soccer
Swimming and Diving - Varsity and Middle School
Volleyball - Varsity and Middle School
According to PIAA directory July 2012

References

External links
 Northgate School District

School districts in Allegheny County, Pennsylvania
Education in Pittsburgh area